Malcolm Wheeler is an Australian former professional rugby league footballer who played in the 1980s and 1990s. He played for Western Suburbs and the Cronulla-Sutherland Sharks in the NSWRL competition.

Playing career
Wheeler made his first grade debut for Cronulla in round 7 of the 1986 NSWRL season against arch-rivals St. George at Shark Park. In 1988, Wheeler played 13 games as Cronulla claimed the Minor Premiership. Wheeler played in both finals matches as the club were eliminated in straight sets. After three more seasons at Cronulla, Wheeler signed for Western Suburbs but played only two matches for the club.

References

1964 births
Western Suburbs Magpies players
Cronulla-Sutherland Sharks players
Australian rugby league players
Rugby league props
Living people